Ersi (also Romanized as Ersī; also known as Ensī) is a village in Valdian Rural District, Ivughli District, Khoy County, West Azerbaijan Province, Iran. At the 2006 census, its population was 120, in 31 families.

References 

Populated places in Khoy County